Serena Capponcelli (born 24 January 1989) is an Italian female high jumper, shot putter, javelin thrower and former bobsledder, who finished at 20th place in the 2018 indoor seasonal world lists in the high jump.

Biography
In 2011 she started to practice the bob as a pilot, until the Olympic call for the 2014 Winter Games, living in Verbania where she met Arno, Belgian amateur cyclist and long-distance mountain runner; they married in September 2015 in Osmate (Varese). She moved to Belgium, in Lede, resuming practicing the high jump for fun, and on 29 January 2017 in Ghent exceeded the quota of 1.89 improving a personal record (1.87 outdoors) that dated back to 2008.

After her national team debut in 2017, in 2018 she opened the season immediately with a personal record: 1.90 m, made on the occasion of the provincial championships in Ghent. At the end of the indoor season she stopped her high jumping activities for pregnancy; in November 2018, Dennis was born. During 2019, she resumed high jumping, with a seasonal best of 1.80 m.

Personal best
High jump: 1.90 m (indoor),  Ghent, 6 January 2018
Shot put: 15.10 m (indoor),  Ancona, 25 February 2018
Javelin throw: 49.30 m,  Turin, 26 June 2011

International results

National championships
Senior

References

External links
 

1989 births
Living people
Italian female high jumpers
Italian female shot putters
Italian female javelin throwers
Italian heptathletes
Italian female bobsledders
20th-century Italian women
21st-century Italian women